Jahnazae Omek Swan (born 9 June 1997) is a Bermudian international footballer who plays for Dandy Town Hornets, as a striker.

Club career
Swan joined Dandy Town Hornets ahead of the 2014–15 Bermudian Premier Division season, winning the Bermuda FA Cup in his first season with the club.

International career
On 8 March 2015, Swan made his international debut for Bermuda in a 2–0 win against Grenada. Swan was selected for Bermuda U20 at the 2017 CONCACAF U-20 Championship in Costa Rica.

References

1997 births
Living people
Bermudian footballers
Association football forwards
Bermuda international footballers
Dandy Town Hornets F.C. players
Bermuda youth international footballers